The Russian  Women's Volleyball Cup in ( Russian : Кубок России по волейболу среди женщин ) is the second most important tournament after the national championship in a series of competitions for women's volleyball clubs in Russia . It has been held since 1993, and managed by the Russian Volleyball Federation.

Winners List

Titles by club

References

External links
 Всероссийская федерация волейбола